Francesca Morotti (born 28 November 1979) is an Italian former gymnast. She competed at the 1996 Summer Olympics.

References

External links
 

1979 births
Living people
Italian female artistic gymnasts
Olympic gymnasts of Italy
Gymnasts at the 1996 Summer Olympics
Sportspeople from the Province of Bergamo